The Gypsy Cried may refer to:

"The Gypsy Cried" (song), a 1962 hit song by American singer-songwriter Lou Christie
 "The Gypsy Cried", a 1989 episode of Married... with Children